Szymon Walków and Jan Zieliński were the defending champions but chose not to defend his title.

Nathaniel Lammons and Albano Olivetti won the title after defeating Sadio Doumbia and Fabien Reboul 4–6, 7–6(8–6), [10–7] in the final.

Seeds

Draw

References

External links
 Main draw

Split Open - Doubles
2022 Doubles